Santeo is a small town located in the Kpone Katamanso District in the Greater Accra Region of Ghana. The town shares boundary with Ashaiman and Tema. In 2018, a 4-unit classroom at a cost of Gh₡425,000 was donated by a group of Indians to promote education in Santeo.

References 

Populated places in the Greater Accra Region